The Great Flood of 1968 was a flood caused by a pronounced trough of low pressure which brought exceptionally heavy rain and thunderstorms to South East England and France in mid-September 1968, with the worst on Sunday 15 September 1968, and followed earlier floods in South West England during July. 
This was likely the severest inland flood experienced in the Home Counties during the last 100 years.

The areas worst hit were Crawley, East Grinstead, Horley, Lewisham, Petersfield, Redhill, Tilbury, Tunbridge Wells and Tonbridge.

On 15 September 1968, the 9:50 Charing Cross to Hastings was diverted along the Edenbridge line, but was surrounded by flood water at Edenbridge railway station. 150 passengers spent 12 hours stuck on the train.

France

In the first seven hours of 15 September 1968 three inches of rain fell on Nice. In Toulon a cyclist was killed by an electricity cable that had fallen into the flooded road. The wine harvest was seriously damaged.

See also
 1947 Thames flood
 July 1968 England and Wales dust fall storms, severe storms in July
 Chew Stoke flood of 1968, July flooding event in Somerset.

References

External links
Met Office, Southeast England floods 1968
The Great Floods Of 1968

Floods in England
1968 natural disasters
1968 in England
1968 in France
1968 floods in the United Kingdom 
1968 floods in Europe 
Floods in France
Floods in Europe
September 1968 events in Europe
September 1968 events in the United Kingdom
1968 disasters in Europe